University of Agricultural Sciences, Dharwad (UASD) is a state agriculture university established by the Government of Karnataka which imparts education, research and extension activities in the fields of agriculture, forestry, food science, agricultural marketing and home science. 

It is on Dharwad-Belgaum road (PB-4) on a campus with space for growing trees and fields for conducting experiments and research.

Constituent colleges
The university has constituent colleges at places of Karnataka: 
 College of Agriculture, Dharwad
 College of Agriculture, Vijayapur
 College of Community Sciences, Dharwad
 College of Agriculture, Hanumanmatti
 College of Forestry, Sirsi

Jurisdiction 
University has jurisdiction over seven districts namely Dharwad, Uttar Kannada, Gadag, Haveri, Belagavi, Bagalkot and Bijapur.

References

External links 
 

Educational institutions established in 1986
Agricultural universities and colleges in Karnataka
Universities and colleges in Hubli-Dharwad
Universities and colleges in Dharwad
Universities in Karnataka
1986 establishments in Karnataka